The Seltenbach is a  stream and an orographically right-hand tributary of the Eisbach in the northeastern part of the Palatine Forest in the German state of Rhineland-Palatinate.

Course 
The source on the northwestern slope of a 320 m-high hill, called the Kleiner Donnersberg, lies on the territory of the municipality of Hettenleidelheim. The stream initially flows in a north-northwesterly direction along the B 47 federal highway and enters the eastern edge of the built-up area of Hettenleidelheim, before it bends away to the northeast. In its subsequent course it draws closer and closer to the Eisbach and finally passes through the southeastern part of Ebertsheim. East of the village itself the Seltenbach empties into the Eisbach from the right at a height of about 160 m.

Between Ebertsheim and Hettenleidelheim the  used to run parallel to the Seltenbach.

See also 
List of rivers of Rhineland-Palatinate

References 

Rivers of Rhineland-Palatinate
Palatinate Forest
Bad Dürkheim (district)
Tributaries of the Eisbach (Rhine)
Rivers of Germany